V. Gopalakrishnan of Tamil Maanila Congress is the first mayor of Coimbatore city, Tamil Nadu.

Mayor of Coimbatore
He was elected as the mayor of the Coimbatore city in 1996. He was the mayor of the city from 1996 to 2001.

References

Mayors of Coimbatore